The National Commission for Indian System of Medicine is a Statutory and regulatory body formed by Government of India for framing policies for institutions engaged in Indian System of Medicine and medical professionals. The institution will have Boards of assessment and rating and Board of ethics and registration of practitioners of Indian systems of medicine.

Indian Medicine Central Council Act, 1970
In 1971, Central Council of Indian Medicine was set up under Indian Medicine Central Council Act, 1970 to monitor monitor higher education in Indian systems of medicine, including Ayurveda, Siddha, Unani and Sowa-Rigpa.

National Commission for Indian System of Medicine (NCISM) Act, 2021 

The National Commission for Indian System of Medicine was formed in 2020  by the Government of India as statutory body by passing The National Commission for Indian System of Medicine (NCISM) Bill. The bill was passed in the Lok Sabha, in August 2021, and replaced Indian Medicine Central Council Act, 1970.

Organisation 
National Commission for Indian System of Medicine is made up of 29 members appointed by the Central Government.

The organisation has two boards, one for assessing and granting educational institution permission for Indian Systems of Medicine, and the other for ethics and registration of practitioners of Indian systems of medicine.

Roles and Responsibilities 
National Commission for Indian System of Medicine is formed with the following roles and responsibilities:

 Frame policies for Institutions engaged in Indian System of Medicine and regulation of medical professionals.
 Assessment of healthcare infrastructure and related human resources.
 Regulations as per bill are adhered by State Medical Councils offering courses in Indian System of Medicine.
 Coordination between autonomous bodies formed under bill.

See also 

 Healthcare in India.

References

External links 
 Official Website

Organisations based in India
Healthcare in India